Blue Ridge Community and Technical College is a public community college in Martinsburg, West Virginia. Formerly the Community and Technical College of Shepherd, it was part of Shepherd College until March 2005, when it was accredited as an independent institution. One year later it was officially renamed Blue Ridge Community and Technical College. Blue Ridge CTC has over 40 collegiate level associate degree and certificate programs, and workforce development and training.

References

External links
Official website

Education in Berkeley County, West Virginia
Educational institutions established in 2005
Buildings and structures in Martinsburg, West Virginia
Two-year colleges in the United States
West Virginia Community and Technical College System
2005 establishments in West Virginia